The Baseball5 World Cup (B5WC, and sometimes referred to as the Senior Baseball5 World Cup) is a mixed-gender Baseball5 (B5) world championship that occurs every two years, with the first edition held in 2022 in Mexico and contested by 12 countries. It is governed by the World Baseball Softball Confederation (WBSC).

History 
The B5WC was originally planned to happen in December 2020 in Mexico. The COVID-19 pandemic led to the delay of the B5WC to June 2021; however, the continued impact of the pandemic delayed the B5WC further. It was later decided that the WC would be played every two years, starting in 2022.

The 14-team 2020 European Baseball5 Championship held in February and March saw France and Lithuania take the two available Europe berths to qualify for the inaugural B5WC. The Oceania qualifier was scheduled to be played in Australia in 2021. The Asia qualifiers were scheduled to be played in Kuala Lumpur, Malaysia in April 2021, but were then postponed due to COVID-19 to August 17–19, 2022.

The first edition of the tournament was won by Cuba, who finished the championship undefeated.

Format 
The 12 countries participating in the World Cup are geographically broken down as follows:

 The host nation automatically qualifies. 
 3 countries from the Americas 
 2 from Europe 
 2 from Africa 
 3 from Asia 
 1 from Oceania

The following format is used for the World Cup: there are 12 countries that play a total of 50 games over 7 days. The tournament will be played in three venues, with the 12 teams separated into two groups of 6 each playing a single round-robin, followed by a "super round" and then the finals. The super round consists of the top three teams from each group, with the results of the group stage being used in the super round for any matchups between countries that played each other in the group stage.

Each team has five active players and eight players total on the roster, with the mixed-gender nature of the tournament requiring teams to have half of their roster to be of each gender, and at least two active players per gender in the game.

Players must be a minimum of 15 years old.

Results

Medal table

Participating nations
 
 
 
 
 
  — Hosts

See also 

 Youth Baseball5 World Cup

References 

 
World Baseball Softball Confederation competitions
World Cup
Recurring sporting events established in 2022